Scott Burton (June 23, 1939 – December 29, 1989) was an American sculptor and performance artist best known for his large-scale furniture sculptures in granite and bronze.

Early years
Burton was born in Greensboro, Alabama to Walter Scott Burton, Jr. and Hortense Mobley Burton.  While Burton was a child, his parents separated and Burton relocated to Washington, DC. with his mother.

Burton began his artistic career at the Washington Workshop Center in Washington D.C. in the mid-1950s under Leon Berkowitz, before progressing to the Hans Hofmann School of Fine Arts in Provincetown, Massachusetts. Between 1959 and 1962 Burton took classes at Goddard College in Plainfield, Vermont, George Washington University in Washington, D.C., Harvard University, and Columbia University, where he finally received his bachelor's degree.

In 1963 Burton was awarded a Master of Fine Arts degree from New York University in New York City.

Art career

During his decade-long relationship with the painter John Button in the 1960s, Burton was introduced to the social networks of the art, dance, and theater communities of New York.  He came to meet, among others, Edward Albee, Jerome Robbins, Lincoln Kirstein, and Alex Katz.

Throughout the 1960s, Burton attempted to be a playwright and librettist, but in 1965 started writing art criticism. In 1966, he began as an editorial associate at ARTnews, eventually becoming an editor. He wrote a substantial amount of art criticism in the late 1960s in this role, including the introduction to the pivotal exhibition Live in Your Head: When Attitudes Become Form at the Kunsthalle Berne.

Starting in 1969, he began to make performance art, first contributing to the "Street Works" events held in 1969 (and featuring such artists as Vito Acconci and Eduardo Costa). Throughout the 1970s, Burton was known mostly as an art critic and performance artist. In 1972, he showed his Group Behavior Tableaux performance at the Whitney Museum of American Art, and went on to stage other tableaux performances at such venues as the Guggenheim, Documenta, and the Berkeley Art Museum. These performances explored nonverbal communication, interpersonal power dynamics, and body language. They were informed by his study of behavioral psychology as well as his participation in the nonverbal signaling of desire in street cruising. During the 1970s, Burton also made other performance works and installations that were explicit in their commitments to gay liberation. For example, in the 1976 exhibition Rooms at P.S.1 in New York, Burton exhibited an installation featuring a fisting dildo and dedicated to "homosexual liberation."

Burton began incorporating furniture into his work as early as 1970, and it would grow from being an active participant in his performances to his main area of output in the 1980s.  He first began making sculptures in 1972, but would not exhibit them until his appearance in the Whitney Biennial in 1975 and, later that year, in a solo exhibition at Artists Space, NYC. Much of his earliest work involved subtly modified found furniture. He made his first sculpture by painting a found Queen Anne revival style chair the color of bronze in 1972, and with the help of a grant was able to have it cast in bronze in 1975, when Bronze Chair was shown across the street from Artists Space during his December 1975 exhibition.

Through the remaining 1970s, Burton would continue to create performance art pieces and, increasingly, sculpture. It was public art that caught his imagination, and starting in 1979 he began to reconsider his role as an artist by making works of functional furniture-as-sculpture (pragmatic sculpture, he called it) that were meant to be largely anonymous, invisible, and woven into the fabric of the everyday.

In the 1980s, he became known primarily as a sculptor of refined sculptures of furniture and ambitious and useful interventions in public space.  His "tables" and "chairs" challenge the distinction between furniture and sculpture. Two-Part Chairs, Right Angle Version (a Pair), (1983-87), represents this concept aptly. The interlocking granite chairs can found at the Western Washington University Public Sculpture Collection. One version, Two-Part Chair (1986) embeds hidden queer experiences, while also serving as a functional chair. The two parts of the chair are mutually supportive, neither part can stand without the other. As David Getsy has discussed, its two interlocking granite pieces represent two highly abstracted figures, posed in a sexual position. Copper Pedestal Table from 1981–83, in the collection of the Honolulu Museum of Art, is an example of such a "table".  It is as much a minimalist sculpture as it is a table.

One of Burton's primary artistic concerns was the dissolution of aesthetic boundaries, especially the traditional boundary between fine art and utilitarian design. The art historian Robert Rosenblum described Burton as "...singular and unique as a person as he was as an artist. His fiercely laconic work destroyed the boundaries between furniture and sculpture, between private delectation and public use and radically altered the way we see many 20th-century masters, including Gerrit Rietveld and Brâncuși."

Death
Burton died of complications due to AIDS on December 29, 1989, at Cabrini Medical Center in New York City. He was survived by his partner, Jonathan Erlitz, who died in 1998.

Notable works in public collections

 Public Table (1978-1979), Princeton University Art Museum, Princeton, New Jersey
 Chair (1979), Allen Memorial Art Museum, Oberlin, Ohio
 Untitled (Red/Yellow/Blue Cube) (1979-1980), Museum of Contemporary Art, Los Angeles
 Pair of Rock Chairs (1980-1981), Museum of Modern Art, New York
 Aluminum Chair (conceived 1980-1981, fabricated 1981), Museum of Modern Art, New York
 Rock Chair (1981), Philadelphia Museum of Art
 Lava Rock Chair (1981-1982), Los Angeles County Museum of Art
 Asymmetrical Settee (conceived 1982, fabricated 1985-1986), Tate, London
 Pair of One Part Chairs (1983), Hessel Museum of Art, Center for Curatorial Studies, Bard College, Annandale-on-Hudson, New York
 Two-Part Chairs, Obtuse Angle (A Pair) (1983-1984), Walker Art Center, Minneapolis
 Pair of Two-Part Chairs, Obtuse Angle (1984), Whitney Museum of American Art, New York
 Untitled – half-size Maquette (c. 1985), Smithsonian American Art Museum, Smithsonian Institution, Washington, D.C.
 Seating for Eight (1985), Art Institute of Chicago
 Settee, Bench, and Balustrade (1985), List Visual Arts Center, Cambridge, Massachusetts
 Low Piece (Bench) (conceived 1985, fabricated 1986), Art Institute of Chicago
 Six-Part Seating (conceived 1985, fabricated 1998), National Gallery of Art, Washington, D.C.
 Sandstone Bench (1986), Des Moines Art Center, Iowa
 Three-Quarter Cube Bench (1986), Museum of Contemporary Art, Chicago
 Seat-Leg Table (conceived 1986, fabricated 1991), Walker Art Center, Minneapolis
 Two-Part Chaise Lounge (1986-1987), Philadelphia Museum of Art
 Settee (1986-1987), The Broad, Los Angeles
 Pair of Parallelogram Chairs (1987), Yale University Art Gallery, New Haven, Connecticut
 Two-Part Chairs, Right Angle Version (a Pair) (1987), Western Washington University Public Sculpture Collection, Bellingham
 Two-Part Bench (a pair) (conceived 1987, fabricated 1989), San Francisco Museum of Modern Art
 Rock Settee (1988), National Gallery of Art, Washington, D.C.
 Rock Settee (1988), National Gallery of Art, Washington, D.C.
 Bench and Table (conceived 1988, fabricated 1991), Smart Museum of Art, Chicago
 Pair of Steel Chairs (1987-1989), Anderson Collection, Stanford University, Stanford, California
 Bench and Table (1988-1989), Carnegie Museum of Art, Pittsburgh
 Bench and Table (1988-1989), Middlebury College Museum of Art, Middlebury, Vermont
 Perforated Metal Settee and Perforated Metal Chairs (1988-1989), Museum of Modern Art, New York
 Bench and Table (conceived 1989, fabricated 1990), The Broad, Los Angeles

See also
 Six-Part Seating

References

External links
 Scott Burton's Obituary, New York Times, January 1, 1990
 Scott Burton Papers in The MoMA Archives, Museum of Modern Art, New York City
 David J. Getsy, Queer Behavior: Scott Burton and Performance Art (Chicago: University of Chicago Press, 2022)
 David J. Getsy, ed., Scott Burton: Collected Writings on Art and Performance, 1965-1975 (Chicago: Soberscove Press, 2012 
 Scott Burton Collection, Whitney Museum of American Art, New York City
 Scott Burton Biography, Tate Modern, London
 Scott Burton at Artcyclopedia

20th-century American sculptors
20th-century American male artists
American male sculptors
American performance artists
American gay artists
Minimalist artists
American furniture designers
1939 births
1989 deaths
AIDS-related deaths in New York (state)
People from Greensboro, Alabama
LGBT people from Alabama
20th-century American LGBT people
New York University alumni
Columbia College (New York) alumni